Iurii Nozdrunov (born 13 December 1989) is a Russian para table tennis player. He won one of the bronze medals in the men's individual C9 event at the 2020 Summer Paralympics held in Tokyo, Japan. He competed at the 2020 Summer Paralympics under the flag of the Russian Paralympic Committee.

He also represented Russia at the 2012 Summer Paralympics held in London, United Kingdom. He competed in the men's individual C9 and men's team C9–10 events.

References

Living people
1989 births
Russian male table tennis players
Paralympic table tennis players of Russia
Paralympic bronze medalists for the Russian Paralympic Committee athletes
Paralympic medalists in table tennis
Table tennis players at the 2012 Summer Paralympics
Table tennis players at the 2020 Summer Paralympics
Medalists at the 2020 Summer Paralympics
Sportspeople from Oryol